Willka Raymi (Quechua willka grandchild / great-grandson / lineage / minor god in the Inca culture, an image of the Willkanuta valley worshipped as God / holy, sacred, divine, willka or wilka Anadenanthera colubrina (a tree), raymi feast) is a feast celebrated in the Cusco Region in Peru. It is the representation of the traditional offering ceremony to Pachamama. The celebrations are held annually on August (24th) in the archaeological complex of Pisac.

See also 
 Pachamama Raymi

References 

Cusco Region
Festivals in Peru
August observances
Inca mythology
Aymara mythology
Inca gods
Aymara gods